Taraxacum is a genus of flowering plants in the family Asteraceae.

Dandelion may also refer to:
 Taraxacum officinale, the common dandelion
 False dandelion, a number of plants similar to dandelions
 Dandelion and burdock, a popular British soft drink
 Dandelion (2004 film), a 2004 motion picture
 Dandelion (2014 film), a 2014 Vietnamese romantic comedy film
 Dandelion Energy, a geothermal heating installation company owned by Alphabet Inc.

Literature 
 Dandelion (magazine), a literary journal started by Joan Clark
 Dandelion (Watership Down), a fictional rabbit in the novel Watership Down
 Dandelion (The Witcher), a character in The Witcher fantasy novels by Polish writer Andrzej Sapkowski

Music 
 Dandelion (American band), a Philadelphia-based grunge band
 Dandelion (French band), a French psychedelic folk band
 Dandelion (album)
 Dandelions (album), a 1989 album by King of the Slums
 "Dandelion" (Rolling Stones song), a 1967 song by The Rolling Stones
 "Dandelion" (Galantis and Jvke song), a 2021 song by Galantis and Jvke
 "Dandelions" (song), a 2017 song by Ruth B.
 "Dandelion", a song by Tracy Bonham from her 1995 EP The Liverpool Sessions
 "Dandelion", a song by Audioslave from Out of Exile
 "Dandelion", a song by Kacey Musgraves from Same Trailer Different Park
 Dandelion Records, a record label in the United Kingdom
 "Dandelion", a song by Gabbie Hanna from Bad Karma

Technology 
 Dandelion, code name for one of the Xerox Star series of workstations
 Dandelion chip, enables metering and focus indication for older lenses on certain types of camera bodies